Volkhov is the name of several inhabited localities in Russia.

Urban localities
Volkhov, a town under the administrative jurisdiction of Volkhovskoye Settlement Municipal Formation in Volkhovsky District of Leningrad Oblast; 

Rural localities
Volkhov (rural locality), a settlement in Berezhkovskoye Settlement Municipal Formation of Volkhovsky District in Leningrad Oblast; 

Renamed localities
Volkhov, name of the selo (a town in 1922–1924) of Gostinopolye in Volkhovsky District of Leningrad Oblast in 1922–1927;